The 2011 Big East men's basketball tournament, a part of the 2010-11 NCAA Division I men's basketball season, took place from March 8–12, 2011 at Madison Square Garden in New York City. This was the third Big East tournament to include all 16 of the conference's teams. The teams finishing 9 through 16 in the regular season standings played first round games, while teams 5 through 8 received byes to the second round. The top 4 teams during the regular season received double-byes to the quarterfinals. The tournament was won by Connecticut, their seventh title, tying Georgetown for the most championships in Big East Men's Basketball Tournament history. Connecticut guard Kemba Walker was named the tournament MVP.

Seeds

Bracket

Championship game

* Denotes Overtime Game

Rutgers–St. John's controversy
In a controversial finish to a second round game, St. John's defeated Rutgers, 65–63, allowing the Red Storm to advance to the quarterfinals for the first time since 2003. The final seconds of the game were heavily criticized by analysts, including the live ESPN crew, for a lack of officiating that appeared to hinder the Scarlet Knights' late rally, including two uncalled personal fouls against Red Storm players, and an incident in which St. John's forward Justin Brownlee appeared to prematurely celebrate by traveling, stepping out of bounds, and throwing the ball into the stands with more than a second remaining in the game. Rutgers' head coach Mike Rice Jr. could be seen screaming frantically for an explanation for the missed calls, while officials Jim Burr, Tim Higgins and Earl Walton had already left the court. At end of the game, ESPN analyst Doris Burke was quoted as saying, "this was the bizarrest ending of a game I've ever seen," and in a later post-game analysis that "the officials won't sleep tonight." Analyst Fran Fraschilla also added that the officiating "crew lost its composure." Following the game, the head of the NCAA's officiating arm, John Adams, who is in charge of selecting 98 officials for the NCAA tournament, called the lack of officiating "unacceptable," but would still consider the overall body of work of each official throughout the season to determine whether or not they would be invited to the tournament. Big East commissioner John Marinatto released a statement acknowledging "two separate officiating errors" that occurred at the end of the game, but conceded that "neither error is reviewable or correctable under NCAA playing rules." The following day, the conference announced that all three officials had voluntarily withdrawn themselves from the remainder of the tournament, which was, according to Marinatto, "in the best interests of everyone involved — including coaches, student-athletes, game officials and Big East member institutions."

See also
 2011 Big East women's basketball tournament

References

External links 

Tournament
Big East men's basketball tournament
Basketball in New York City
College sports in New York City
Sports competitions in New York City
Sports in Manhattan
Big East men's basketball tournament
Big East men's basketball tournament
2010s in Manhattan
Madison Square Garden